Lawrence James Henry Tynes (born May 3, 1978) is a Scottish-born former American football placekicker. After playing soccer for Milton High School a coach suggested he try out for the football team as a kicker. He played college football at Troy and was signed by the Kansas City Chiefs as an undrafted free agent in 2001. He spent two seasons on the practice squad in Kansas City, then played in NFL Europe and in the Canadian Football League (CFL). He came back to Kansas City and played for the Chiefs for three seasons, and was then traded to the Giants in 2007. In his first season with the Giants, he kicked the game-winning field goal in overtime against the Green Bay Packers in the 2007–08 NFC Championship Game, which qualified the Giants for Super Bowl XLII. Four years later, he kicked another overtime field goal against the San Francisco 49ers in the 2011–12 NFC Championship Game, which qualified the Giants for Super Bowl XLVI. He experienced his best success in New York, winning two Super Bowl championships in 2007 and 2011, defeating the New England Patriots in both games.

Tynes is the only player in NFL history to have two overtime game-winning field goals in the playoffs. Tynes kicked the longest post-season field goal in Lambeau Field post-season history (47 yards) in the 2007 NFC Championship Game. He then kicked a 31-yard chip shot in overtime in the NFC Championship game to advance the New York Giants to Super Bowl XLVI in 2011.

Professional career

Kansas City Chiefs (2001–2002)
Signed as an undrafted free agent, Tynes spent the first two seasons with the Chiefs but only on their practice squad.

Scottish Claymores (2002)
Tynes spent a short period of time with the Scottish Claymores of NFL Europe during 2002.

Ottawa Renegades (2002–2003)
After his departure from the Claymores, Tynes signed for the Renegades organization in the Canadian Football League.

Second stint with the Kansas City Chiefs (2004–2006)
Tynes re-signed for the Chiefs and was ready to be the next full-time kicker for the team. During the 2004 season, he converted 17 field goals out of 23 opportunities. In 2005, he made 27 field goals out of 33 opportunities. In 2006, he made 24 field goals out of 31 opportunities.

New York Giants (2007–2012)

2007
Tynes's first year with the Giants saw him miss 4 field goals of less than 40 yards, completing 23 out of 27 attempts overall. During the NFC Championship game in Green Bay against the Packers, played in sub-zero temperatures, Tynes hit his first two field goal attempts, then missed two field goal attempts in the fourth quarter, the latter after a bad snap. In overtime he made the game-winning 47 yard field goal to win the game for the Giants, 23-20, as the team moved on to play in the Super Bowl with the win. Tynes earned his first career championship ring as the Giants defeated the New England Patriots in Super Bowl XLII, ruining what would have been an unprecedented 19-0 season for the Patriots.

2008
Tynes was limited to only two games during the 2008 season due to a torn meniscus that was bothering him since training camp. He still made one field goal before undergoing season-ending knee surgery. During his absence, John Carney replaced him as the new kicker for the season.

2009
During the 2009 season, Tynes converted 27 field goals out of 32 opportunities.

2010
Playing 15 games of the 2010 regular season, Tynes made 19 field goals out of 23 opportunities.

2011
In 2011, Tynes converted 19 field goals out of 24 opportunities. During the NFC Championship game against the San Francisco 49ers, Tynes kicked another walk-off field goal in overtime to win the game, 20–17. Tynes got his second championship title as the Giants won Super Bowl XLVI against the Patriots. In the game, he converted one extra point and two field goals (a 38-yarder and a 33-yarder, both in the third quarter).

2012
In the 2012 season, Tynes made a career-high 33 field goals out of 39 opportunities.

Tampa Bay Buccaneers (2013)
On July 17, 2013, the Buccaneers signed Tynes to a one-year contract worth $905,000 after Connor Barth suffered a season-ending torn Achilles tendon.  He contracted MRSA (methicillin-resistant Staphylococcus aureus) in August 2013, after his toe failed to heal from surgery to remove an ingrown toenail. After spending the entire season on injured reserve, Tynes was released on March 11, 2014, and the infection effectively ended his NFL career.  Tynes sued the Buccaneers in 2015 for $20 million, claiming that unsanitary conditions led to his MRSA infection.  Other teammates, including Carl Nicks and Johnthan Banks, also contracted MRSA around the same time while with the Buccaneers, and while Nicks also found his career at an end, Banks went on to play several more seasons in the NFL.  Tynes and the Buccaneers agreed to a confidential settlement in 2017.

Personal life
Tynes is married to Amanda, and the couple have twin sons.  Tynes is the seventh Scottish-born player in NFL history. He is the son of a former American Navy SEAL and a Scottish mother. The family lived in Campbeltown until he was 10 years old, before moving to the United States. His father, Larry, was a member of SEAL Team 2, stationed in Scotland in the early 1970s. Larry is currently a detective in the Santa Rosa County, Florida, Sheriff's Department in Milton, Florida. One of Lawrence Tynes's brothers, Jason, served in the United States Army in Iraq and Kuwait.

His other brother, Mark, is serving 27 years in federal prison on drug and witness intimidation charges stemming from his 2004 involvement in a plan to move  of marijuana between Texas and Florida. Tynes has sought a presidential pardon to shorten or commute his brother's sentence. He has acknowledged his brother's guilt but feels the sentence was too harsh. However, in the proceedings, Mark was reportedly belligerent and uncooperative. The judge who presided at the case had parameters in which to sentence Mark and, because of his foul and unruly behaviour, gave Mark the maximum sentence.

Tynes enjoys soccer and supports Celtic Football Club.

Legal trouble
On August 17, 2005, Tynes turned himself in to Pierce County, Wisconsin, jail after punching a bar patron and breaking a bouncer's nose in a bar fight the previous weekend (the Chiefs' training camp at the time was based out of River Falls). Tynes was charged with one felony count of substantial battery and one count of misdemeanor battery. He was released on a $15,000 signature bond. Tynes paid a $397 fine for the incident.

References

External links

 Tampa Bay Buccaneers bio

1978 births
Living people
American football placekickers
British emigrants to the United States
Scottish players of American football
Troy Trojans football players
Kansas City Chiefs players
Scottish Claymores players
Canadian football placekickers
Ottawa Renegades players
New York Giants players
Tampa Bay Buccaneers players
Troy University alumni
Sportspeople from Greenock
Sportspeople from Clifton, New Jersey
People from Milton, Florida
Sportspeople from Overland Park, Kansas
Milton High School (Florida) alumni